The Mimara Museum is an art museum in the city of Zagreb, Croatia. It is situated on Roosevelt Square, housing the collection by Wiltrud and Ante Topić Mimara. Its full official name is the Art Collection of Ante and Wiltrud Topić Mimara.

According to Thomas Hoving, "Topic Mimara's hoard of masterpieces are 95 percent fakes produced by him and his hired forgers.". On its opening, a "prominent Yugoslav art historian" told AP that "it might be the greatest collection of fakes in the world.". According to Federico Zeri, the preview contained "trash along with some good things. Ninety percent is junk."; Ante Topić Mimara built his collection by forging, but also by looting and swindling.

Of the total of 3,700 varied works of art, more than 1,500 exhibits constitute permanent holdings, dating from the prehistoric period up to the 20th century. Some of the most famous exhibits include works attributed to Lorenzetti, Giorgione, Veronese, Canaletto, 60 paintings to the Dutch masters  Van Goyen, Ruisdael, 50 works attributed to the Flemish masters Van der Weyden, Bosch, Rubens, Van Dyck, more than 30 to the Spanish masters Velázquez, Murillo, Goya, some 20 paintings to the German masters Holbein, Liebermann, Leibl, some 30 paintings to the English painters Gainsborough, Turner, Bonington and more than 120 paintings attributed to the French masters Georges de La Tour, Boucher, Chardin, Delacroix, Corot, Manet, Renoir, Degas. The drawings collection holds some 200 drawings attributed to Bronzino, Guardi, Claude Lorrain, Le Brun, Oudry, Greuze, Géricault, and Friesz.
The museum was opened in 1987. The building itself originates from the 19th century, its conversion to a museum overseen by a Zagreb architect Kuno Waidmann; originally it served as a gymnasium.

The Mimara Museum was damaged by the 2020 Zagreb earthquake and as of 2022 remains closed for repairs.

See also 
 History of Zagreb

References

External links 
 
 

Art museums and galleries in Zagreb
Donji grad, Zagreb
Buildings and structures completed in 1895
Art museums established in 1987
1987 establishments in Croatia
Neoclassical architecture in Croatia